Laurel Run (also known as Laurel Run Creek) is a tributary of Huntington Creek, in Luzerne County, Pennsylvania, in the United States. Wild trout naturally reproduce in the stream. The surficial geology in the area mainly consists of Wisconsinan Till, Wisconsinan Ice-Contact Stratified Drift, and bedrock consisting of sandstone and shale. The stream is designated as a Least Disturbed Stream.

Course
Laurel Run begins in a valley in Ross Township. It flows west-southwest for nearly a mile alongside Dobson Road before turning southwest for a short distance. The stream then turns west-southwest again for several tenths of a mile before crossing State Route 4024 and reaching its confluence with Huntington Creek.

Geography and geology

Laurel Run is in the Susquehanna Lowlands section of the ridge and valley physiographic province.

For most of the length of Laurel Run, the surficial geology in its vicinity consists of a glacial or resedimented till known as Wisconsinan Till. On the sides of its valley, there is bedrock consisting of sandstone and shale. At the mouth of the stream, the surficial geology features Wisconsinan Ice-Contact Stratified Drift, which contains stratified sand and gravel, as well as some boulders.

Watershed
The stream is entirely within the United States Geological Survey quadrangle of Sweet Valley.

Laurel Run is classified as a Least Disturbed Stream by the Pennsylvania Natural Heritage Program. Such streams are described as "high-quality stream segments" that "ideally have little disturbance from human influences and demonstrate natural ecological function".

Less than 0.75 percent of the watershed of Laurel Run is developed and less than 32.5 percent is agricultural land. More than 75 percent of the watershed is on forested land. More than 80 percent of the stream's riparian zone is forested, while less than 15 percent is agricultural and less than 1 percent is developed.

There are no dams or instances of point source pollution in the watershed of Laurel Run. There are fewer than five road crossings.

History
Laurel Run was entered into the Geographic Names Information System on August 2, 1979. Its identifier in the Geographic Names Information System is 1178994.

In the early 1900s, the Commissioners of Luzerne County requested permission to construct a bridge over Laurel Run. The road was to be a reinforced concrete slab bridge on the road from Mooretown to Sweet Valley.

Biology
Wild trout naturally reproduce in Laurel Run from its headwaters downstream to its mouth.

See also
Shingle Run (Huntington Creek), next tributary of Huntington Creek going downstream
Mitchler Run, next tributary of Huntington Creek going upstream
List of tributaries of Fishing Creek (North Branch Susquehanna River)
List of rivers of Pennsylvania

References

Rivers of Luzerne County, Pennsylvania
Tributaries of Fishing Creek (North Branch Susquehanna River)
Rivers of Pennsylvania